Moral courage is the courage to take action for moral reasons despite the risk of adverse consequences.

Courage is required to take action when one has doubts or fears about the consequences.  Moral courage therefore involves deliberation or careful thought.  Reflex action or dogmatic fanaticism do not involve moral courage because such impulsive actions are not based upon moral reasoning.

Moral courage may also require physical courage when the consequences are punishment or other bodily peril.

Moral courage has been seen as the exemplary modernist form of courage.

Parenting approach
Parenting with the incorporation of moral courage can have an effect on the self-expression of the child during late adolescence. The development of moral courage within parenting is not only affected by the parent's passed down moral values but the children's autonomy on how to perceive and practice their moral values. Those who incorporate the practice of their morals values into their everyday lives engage in moral courage to protect those values as well.

Examples of moral courage

Discrimination example
As an example, moral courage can be shown through selfless actions aimed to diminish or eliminate discrimination.

A research study was performed using qualitative research methods to analyze the process of how and why individuals become LGBT allies. The study mentions how human resources development play a role to help prevent LGBT discrimination in the workplace.

References

Further reading
 
 

Courage
Moral psychology
Courage